Mirjoli is a small village on the banks of Vashishthi River  in the mandal of Chiplun, Ratnagiri district, Maharashtra.

Villages in Ratnagiri district